State Route 116 (SR 116) is a  state highway in Sumter County in the western part of the U.S. state of Alabama.

Route description

SR 116 begins at an intersection with SR 17 north of Emelle. The highway serves as a connecting route between the northern half of Sumter County and neighboring Greene County. It is a two-lane highway for its entire length, and travels through no cities or towns until it reaches its eastern terminus, an intersection with SR 39 in Gainesville.

History

SR 116 was established in 1963, replacing Sumter County Route 26 (Sumter CR 26).

Major intersections

See also

References

116
Transportation in Sumter County, Alabama